Originally known as "Tail of the Tiger", Karmê Chöling is a Shambhala Buddhist meditation retreat center and community in Barnet, Vermont . The staff there offers meditation programs and retreats in the Shambhala Buddhist tradition to hundreds of students each year. Karmê Chöling facilities include 717 acres (2.9 km2) of wooded land, seven meditation halls, a Zen archery range, an organic garden, dining facilities, single and double rooms, dormitory housing, and seven retreat cabins. The center also houses visitors and staff in tents on wooden platforms in the warmer months of May through September. The center gives retreats, seminars, and workshops on meditation, gardening, archery, and theater.

History
In 1970, Karmê Chöling was founded in Barnet, Vermont by the Vidyadhara, (literally meaning “awareness holder;” a spiritual leader of Buddhism) Chögyam Trungpa Rinpoche. Karmê Chöling is the first teaching seat in North America of Chögyam Trungpa Rinpoche, a 20th-century Buddhist meditation master that was credited with bringing Buddhism to the western world. Originally a dairy farm, the building was purchased by Chögyam Trungpa Rinpoche’s students and was converted under his supervision into a Shambhala Buddhist retreat center. It was called “Tail of the Tiger”, but in 1974 the name was changed to Karmê Chöling, which remains its name today.

Since its purchase, meditation rooms, sleeping quarters for key staff and members of certain programs have been added.

Karmê Chöling is affiliated with Shambhala International, led by Sakyong Mipham Rinpoche, a holder of the Karma Kagyu, Nyingma, and Shambhala Buddhism Lineages.

Programs

Karmê Chöling works with both experienced practitioners of Shambhala Buddhism as well as novices and people interested in learning more about meditation or their way of life. It is run by a core residential staff with help from paid employees, community members, and volunteers. There are different types of retreats.

Introductory Meditation Retreats include many of the retreats that are under the subheadings below. They introduce the practice of mindfulness/awareness meditation, and typically last a week or weekend, although some are longer. A complete listing of these retreats can be found on.

Way of Shambhala Retreats are designed for those who have never meditated before and beginners in meditation, although there are also some programs for those who have mastered these basics. Details about individual retreats can be found at.

Qigong is a Daoist spiritual discipline.

Children, Youth, Teen, and Family Retreats are designed to “support families in raising children in an awakened way and to help families deepen their connection to meditation practice and the Shambhala Buddhist tradition.” These programs address families, youth 13–17 years old, and younger children.

Garden Programs are two-week sessions teaching connecting with the earth and combining this with meditation, or longer apprenticeship program which also teaches organic gardening principles with meditation.

Advanced Programs include prerequisites within Shambhala Buddhism. They are typically no more than 11 days long.

Controversy 
Karmê Chöling's spiritual leader Sakyong Mipham Rinpoche, Ösel Rangdrol Mukpo, and sexual assault.
https://en.wikipedia.org/wiki/Sakyong_Mipham

References

External links

Shambhala vision
Tibetan Buddhist places
Buddhist monasteries in the United States
1970 establishments in Vermont